The Autódromo Internacional Nelson Piquet (Nelson Piquet International RaceTrack), also known as Jacarepaguá after the neighbourhood in which it was located, and also as the Autódromo Riocentro, was a motorsport circuit in Rio de Janeiro, Brazil. Opened in January 1978, a few weeks before 1978 Brazilian Grand Prix, it hosted the Formula One Brazilian Grand Prix on ten occasions, and was also used for CART, motorcycle racing and stock car racing. In 2012, it was demolished to make way for facilities to be used at the 2016 Summer Olympics.

The original circuit
The original circuit was built between 1971 and 1977 on the site of the Barra da Tijuca road course, which had itself been built on reclaimed marshland and was operational from 1964 to 1970. The maximum spectator capacity was 90,000. With the exception of the 1978 race, the Formula One Grand Prixs were held in March or April in Rio's very hot and humid tropical early autumn weather.

Formula One

The first Brazilian Grand Prix at the circuit took place shortly after opening, in 1978, and was won by Argentina's Carlos Reutemann in a V12 Ferrari 312T3 in the oppressive heat and humidity of Rio's January summer season, after Sweden's Ronnie Peterson had taken pole position in the revolutionary ground-effect Lotus 78-Ford.

After the 1979 and 1980 races had been held at the Interlagos circuit in São Paulo, the F1 circus left the  Interlagos circuit due to safety concerns with the circuit and the growing slums of the circuit's surrounding areas being at odds with Formula One's new glamour image. Rio's beaches and beautiful scenery were more suited to this new image, and the Brazilian Grand Prix was then held at Jacarepaguá for the remainder of the 1980s. The 1981 race was held in very wet conditions and was again won by Reutemann, this time driving a Williams FW07C-Ford, and in controversial circumstances: he disobeyed the team's orders to let teammate and then-reigning World Champion, Australia's Alan Jones, take the win.

The 1982 race, held at the height of the FISA–FOCA war, was also shrouded in controversy. Rio born driver Nelson Piquet, who had won the World Championship the year before, finished first in a Brabham BT49-Ford, with Finland's Keke Rosberg second in a Williams FW07C-Ford. However, both drivers were disqualified for being underweight, having raced with "water-cooled brakes". This promoted Alain Prost, third in the turbocharged Renault RE30, to the win, the first of an eventual five for the Frenchman at the circuit and start a streak of 7 straight wins for turbo powered cars at the circuit until the original turbo era ended following the  season. The disqualifications, however, prompted most FOCA-aligned teams – including Brabham and Williams – to boycott the San Marino Grand Prix two races later. However, unlike the 1980 Spanish Grand Prix where the factory teams of Ferrari, Renault and Alfa Romeo (all who were on the FISA side of the war) boycotted the race and the results were eventually voided, the 1982 San Marino Grand Prix results without the FOCA teams were counted.

Piquet and Rosberg again crossed the line first and second in the 1983 race, although this time only Rosberg was disqualified, having had a push start in the pits after his Williams FW08-Ford caught fire. Unusually, the drivers below Rosberg were not promoted accordingly. The win was the first of two wins at the circuit for Piquet, who would go on to win his second World Championship that year. Piquet won the race in his Brabham-BMW turbo and went on to be the first ever F1 World Champion to be powered by a turbocharged engine. From 1983 until 1989, the Brazilian Grand Prix was the opening race of the season.

Both the 1984 and 1985 races were won by Prost, now racing a McLaren-TAG. The 1984 race also saw the debut of Ayrton Senna, driving a Toleman TG183-Hart where he had the unfortunate 'honour' of being the first retirement of the  season. Piquet won the 1986 race in a Williams FW11-Honda, with Senna making it a Brazilian 1–2 in a Lotus 98T-Renault, before Prost beat Piquet to win the 1987 race in a McLaren MP4/3-TAG.

However, he had to settle for third in a Lotus 100T-Honda in that year's race, as Prost once again won in a McLaren MP4/4-Honda. 1988 was the last year of the original turbo era in Formula One. For Prost it was his 5th win in 9 races at the circuit.

The 1989 race was the first to be held following the banning of turbo engines, and Great Britain's Nigel Mansell took a surprise win in his V12 powered Ferrari 640, complete with Formula 1's first semi-automatic gearbox. Another Brazilian driver, Maurício Gugelmin, finished third in a March 881 (Prost finished second), while Senna, who had won his first World Championship the year before, set the fastest ever lap of the circuit in qualifying with a time of 1:25.302 to take pole position in a V10 McLaren MP4/5-Honda. After winning the race, Mansell joked that with the Ferrari's known reliability problems at the time he had booked an early flight out of Rio in anticipation of a short race for him.

In , the Brazilian Grand Prix moved to a shortened Interlagos, where it has been held ever since.

CART

From 1996 to 2000 the CART series staged events at Jacarepaguá in an accessory trapezoid-shaped speedway named "Emerson Fittipaldi Speedway", having approximately  length. The race, originally the Rio 400, before being shortened to the Rio 200 in 1999, was first won in 1996 by Brazilian André Ribeiro.

The circuit qualifying record for the Emerson Fittipaldi Speedway was set by Emerson's own nephew Christian Fittipaldi with a time of 38.565 for the  track.

The long back straight of the road course which had grandstands running its entire  length became the front straight of the Speedway, with the pits located in the area between the straight and the pit straight of the road course.

Motorcycle Grand Prix
The circuit also hosted the Rio de Janeiro motorcycle Grand Prix race from 1995 to 2004. Italy's nine time World Champion Valentino Rossi won the most races, winning four from 2000–2003, while Australian five-time World Champion Michael Doohan won the 1996 and 1997 races.

The first Rio Motorcycle Grand Prix was won by Italian Luca Cadalora, riding a Yamaha YZR500. The final race held at the circuit in 2004, was won by Japanese rider Makoto Tamada riding a Honda RC211V.

Honda won seven of the nine Rio Grands Prix held, with Yamaha winning two.

Lap records 

The official fastest race lap records at the Autódromo Internacional Nelson Piquet (Jacarepaguá) are listed as:

Final years

As of early 2005, there were plans to partially demolish this racetrack to make room for a new sports complex to be used for the 2007 Pan American Games. However, the FIA's ruling on a track's minimum length is ambiguous. In 2006, despite rumors of the race being cancelled, the Brazilian Stock Car Rio event was contested on a temporary short circuit combining sections of the oval and normal circuits and the start/finish line was moved to the back stretch, which was cut short to make room for the Pan-American games venues.

Another proposal for the circuit was to have both a club permanent circuit, and an international-length half-permanent, half-car park circuit involving that circuit and an extension which utilises the car parks of the park. That would have been designed by Hermann Tilke.

In January 2008 it was announced that the track was to be demolished to allow the city to build an Olympic Training Centre venue for the Rio de Janeiro bid for the 2016 Summer Olympics which Rio was successful in winning.

As of 2008, the  track comprised the original circuit's second half with a hairpin that connects the previous main straight and back straight. It remained active, with races such as Stock Car's Corrida do Milhão.

The track and adjacent motorsport facilities were finally demolished in November 2012 to make way for new facilities to be used during the 2016 Summer Olympics.

In March 2013 Bernie Ecclestone, CEO of the Formula One Group, said discussions were taking place for the Formula 1 Grand Prix to move from the Interlagos Circuit in São Paulo to Rio de Janeiro and a suitable time for this could be 2016, coinciding with the 2016 Olympic Games. Formula 1 last raced at Rio in 1989 before returning to São Paulo in 1990, where it has been held since. However, no Grand Prix was held in Rio as of 2022.

See also 

 Barra Olympic Park

References

External links 

 Satellite picture by Google Maps
 Trackpedia guide to driving Autódromo Internacional Nelson Piquet
 Save the Rio de Janeiro International Raceway

Official website 
 Autódromo Internacional Nelson Piquet (Rio de Janeiro)

Champ Car circuits
Nelson Piquet
Nelson Piquet
Nelson Piquet
Nelson Piquet
Sports venues in Rio de Janeiro (city)
Defunct motorsport venues
Sports venues completed in 1977
Sports venues demolished in 2012
Defunct sports venues in Brazil
Demolished buildings and structures in Brazil
Demolished sports venues